Red Mountain High School is a 4-year public high school in the eastern part of Mesa, Arizona. It opened in 1988 with Robert Free as the founding principal. In the 1994–95 and 1995-96 school years, it was honored as a Blue Ribbon school. RMHS received the 2014 A+ School Award under the direction of Dr. Gerald Slemmer, principal (2004-2014). They received the award again in 2018 under Mr. Jared Ryan, principal (2014-2019). Red Mountain High School has over 3,300 students enrolled as of the 2020–21 school year. It is a part of the Mesa Unified School District.

Athletics 
Offered Athletics:

 Badminton
 Cross Country
 Football
 Pom & Cheer
 B/G Golf
 Swim & Dive
 B/G Volleyball
 Girls Flag football
 B/G Basketball
 B/G Soccer
 Wrestling
 E-Sports
 Baseball
 Softball
 Track & Field
 B/G Tennis
 B/G Beach Volleyball

Demographics 
During the 2020–2021 school year, the demographic break of the 3,340 students enrolled was:

 Male - 52%
 Female -  48%
 American Indian/Alaska Native - 1.8%
 Asian - 2%
 Black - 3.6%
 Hispanic - 23.6%
 Native Hawaiian/Pacific Islander - 0.7%
 White - 65.6%
 Multiracial - 2.5%

Feeder Schools 
Junior High Schools that feed into Red Mountain High School (and the Elementary Schools that feed into the junior high schools):

Fremont Junior High School:
 Falcon Hill Elementary School

 Jefferson Elementary School

 Las Sendas Elementary School

 James Madison Elementary School

 Salk Elementary School

 William Howard Taft Elementary School

 Wilson Elementary School

 Zaharis Elementary School

Shepherd Junior High School:
 Barbara Bush Elementary School

 Falcon Hill Elementary School

 Ramon S. Mendoza Elementary School

 Sandra Day O'Connor Elementary School

 Red Mountain Ranch Elementary School

Notable alumni
Charlie Beljan (2003) - PGA Tour golfer
Lennox Gordon - NFL player
Brian Jennings - NFL player
Nick Miller (2005) - NFL player
Kayla Pedersen (2007) - WNBA player with the Tulsa Shock
Vance Wilson (1991) - MLB player

References

External links
 Red Mountain High School
Mesa Public Schools

Public high schools in Arizona
Educational institutions established in 1988
High schools in Mesa, Arizona
1988 establishments in Arizona